The Las Vegas Challenger is a professional tennis tournament played on outdoor hard courts. It is currently part of the ATP Challenger Tour. It was held annually for many years through 2000 in Las Vegas, Nevada, and was brought back starting in the 2015 season.

Past finals

Singles

Doubles

References

ATP Challenger Tour
Hard court tennis tournaments in the United States
Tennis in Las Vegas